Chennai Super Kings were one of the eight teams that took part in the 2010 Indian Premier League. They were captained by Indian skipper Mahendra Singh Dhoni for the third year in succession. They won the tournament after beating Mumbai Indians by 22 runs in the finals. With this, they qualified for the 2010 Champions League Twenty20, which they won by beating the Warriors in the finals.

Background
Chennai Super Kings had finished as semifinalists in the 2009 edition of the IPL held in South Africa. They had failed to qualify for the inaugural CLT20 as the other losing semifinalists, Delhi Daredevils, progressed to the event having a better record than CSK in the group stages.

Pre-season player signings
The Super Kings added Justin Kemp and Thisara Perera to their roster, the former filling an empty slot while the latter serving as a substitute to Andrew Flintoff, who had planned to skip that season. They also signed former ICL cricketer Hemang Badani and local all-rounder  Chandrasekar Ganapathy. Australian pacer Doug Bollinger was drafted as the replacement player for all-rounder Jacob Oram who was injured before the start of the tournament.

Squad
Players with international caps before the start of the 2010 IPL season are listed in bold.

Indian Premier League
The Chennai Super Kings began the 2010 season with a 31-run defeat against the defending champions Deccan Chargers. In their second match, they beat the Kolkata Knight Riders by 55 runs, as captain MS Dhoni scored an unbeaten 66 off 33 balls. During the match Dhoni picked up an injury after he was hit on the arm by a rising delivery from Shane Bond. The injury forced Dhoni to sit out of the tournament for a week during which Suresh Raina took over the captaincy of the team. Then they also managed to beat Delhi Daredevils comfortably by 5 wickets as Matthew Hayden struck 93 off 43 deliveries. Their fourth match of the season, against Kings XI Punjab, went to the Super Over after the match ended in a tie. In the Super Over, CSK set Punjab a target of 10, which the latter chased down comfortably with two balls to spare. They lost to the Royal Challengers in the next match after RCB batsman Robin Uthappa scored an unbeaten 68 to help his team put up a big total on the board. At Mumbai, Suresh Raina scored an unbeaten 83 to take his team to 180/2 in 20 overs. But, the home team Mumbai Indians chased down this total, thanks to their openers Sachin Tendulkar and Shikhar Dhawan, both of whom struck fifties. This game also marked the return of their skipper Dhoni who missed the three previous games due to injury. They lost their fourth game on trot after they went down to Rajasthan Royals by 17 runs at Ahmedabad. The losing streak came to an end after Murali Vijay made a 39-ball 78 against the Royal Challengers to help his team chase down the target of 162. Vijay continued his good form in the next game against Rajasthan Royals, scoring 127 (56 balls) including eight fours and 11 sixes. He combined with Albie Morkel (62 off 34 balls) to set up the biggest total in the history of IPL (246/5). Chennai managed to win the game by 23 runs despite Rajasthan batsmen Naman Ojha's 94* and Shane Watson's quickfire 60. The match also witnessed the IPL debut of pacer Doug Bollinger, who became a vital cog in their bowling attack. He impressed with figures of 2/15 (4 overs) in the high-scoring match. They could beat the consistent Mumbai Indians at Chepauk with an all-round performance by Suresh Raina. Raina impressed again in the next game against Deccan Chargers by scoring 52, but this knock could not save CSK from a 6-wicket defeat. In another home game, the Super Kings beat the Kolkata Knight Riders by 9 wickets with 39 balls to spare. Spinner Ravichandran Ashwin, who had a good season with the ball, delivered once again with figures of 4-0-16-3. His effort was ably supported by the CSK batsmen Vijay (50* from 40) and Raina (78* from 39). However, they lost to Delhi Daredevils by 6 wickets after poor showing by the batsmen. Delhi skipper Gautam Gambhir won the Man of the Match for his unbeaten 57. Their last league match, a do-or-die for Chennai, was at the picturesque Dharamsala against Kings XI Punjab. The match is remembered for CSK skipper Dhoni's innings of 54* (29) that turned the match on its head to give Chennai an improbable win. He was well supported by Raina's 46 (27) and Subramaniam Badrinath, who scored 53 (36) to set up the chase of 192. They ended their league fixtures with 14 points from as many matches, finishing with the same number of points as three other teams with two semi-final spots at stake. Chennai got the third place as they had the best Net run rate of the four teams which finished on 14 points.

In the semi-final at Navi Mumbai, the Super Kings bowled out the Deccan Chargers for 102 after setting them a target of 143, winning the game by 38 runs to book their place in the finals. Bollinger won the Man of the Match for his bowling effort of 4-1-13-4. The win also assured them a place in the 2010 Champions League Twenty20. At the IPL final, the Chennai Super Kings took on the tournament favorites Mumbai Indians. Chennai, electing to bat first after winning the toss, were struggling at one stage with the score of 68/3 after 12 overs. But then, Raina produced, what turned out to be a match-winning innings, 57* (35), as his team put up 168/5 in 20 overs. Mumbai Indians kept losing wickets in their run-chase and eventually lost the match by 22 runs. Chennai Super Kings were crowned champions of the tournament for the first time. Raina won the Man of the Match award in the final while Mumbai skipper Sachin Tendulkar was named Player of the Tournament.

Season standings

Match log

Most runs

Most wickets

Champions League T20

They topped Group A with 6 points (3 wins and 1 loss) to qualify for the semi-finals where they had to face Royal Challengers Bangalore at Kingsmead, Durban. After a comprehensive victory of 52 runs by (D/L) method against the Challengers, they played their first CLT20 final at Johannesburg. They beat the Chevrolet Warriors by 8 wickets in the final, becoming the first IPL side to win the CLT20. Murali Vijay won the Golden Bat for scoring the maximum runs in the tournament and Ravichandran Ashwin was the leading wicket-taker and he was awarded the Man of the Series.

Season Standings

Match log

Most runs

Most wickets

References

External links

Chennai Super Kings seasons
2010 Indian Premier League